Skelton Township may refer to the following townships in the United States:

 Skelton Township, Warrick County, Indiana
 Skelton Township, Carlton County, Minnesota